Brittani Nichols (born June 20, 1988) is an American producer, actress, comedian, and writer. In 2016, Nichols wrote, produced, and starred in the film Suicide Kale, which won the Audience Award for Best U.S. Dramatic Feature at 2016 Outfest. She has written for the television programs A Black Lady Sketch Show, Take My Wife, Strangers, and Abbott Elementary.

Career

Television and film 
Nichols moved to Los Angeles after college and developed the web series Words With Girls (2012), which she later rewrote as a full-length pilot that was produced by Issa Rae and Deniese Davis's initiative ColorCreative.tv. The series centered a group of queer twenty-something roommates in LA and starred Nichols, Corbin Reid, Hannah Hart, Alex Sturman, and Lauren Neal. In 2016, Nichols wrote, produced, and starred in Suicide Kale, a dark comedy with an all queer-woman cast. Nichols stated in an interview that she set out to make a lesbian movie that "wasn’t about coming out, sleeping with a man, or a character death at the end". Both Words with Girls and Suicide Kale draw on Nichols' own experiences as a lesbian, and she has stated repeatedly in interviews that she is committed to increasing LGBTQ and African-American representation in media. Suicide Kale won the Audience Award for Best U.S. Dramatic Feature at Outfest.

She has appeared in a number of television programs including Billy on the Street, Take My Wife, and Transparent.

Nichols was a writer for season one of the HBO series A Black Lady Sketch Show. She has also written for Strangers, Drop the Mic, and Take My Wife.

In 2020 it was announced that Nichols would produce a dramedy, Toothbrush, for Quibi through ColorCreative.

She is a staff writer for the ABC comedy Abbott Elementary.

Other work 
In 2016, she released a five track EP, Brittani Nichols Likes You.

Nichols previously co-hosted two podcasts, Brand New Podcast with Ariana Lenarsky, and Hamilton the Podcast with Khalehla Rixon.

Personal life 
Nichols was born and raised in Chicago. She attended Yale University, where she played on the women's basketball team. She credits Dave Chappelle with cultivating her interest in comedy.

She is gay.

She endorsed Hugo Soto-Martinez and Eunisses Hernandez during the 2022 Los Angeles elections.

Filmography

Acting

Writer

See also 
 List of lesbian filmmakers

References

External links
 
Official website 

1988 births
Living people
21st-century American comedians
American film actresses
African-American actresses
African-American female comedians
African-American screenwriters
American lesbian actresses
American lesbian artists
American lesbian writers
LGBT producers
American LGBT screenwriters
LGBT African Americans
Actresses from Chicago
Members of the Democratic Socialists of America
Yale University alumni
Writers from Chicago
American women comedians
Comedians from Illinois
Screenwriters from Illinois
21st-century American women writers
21st-century American actresses
21st-century American screenwriters
21st-century African-American women writers
21st-century African-American writers
20th-century African-American people
21st-century American LGBT people
20th-century African-American women